Liga Perdana 2 or Liga Perdana Dua was the nation's second-tier professional football league in Malaysia that operated from 1998 to 2003.

The league was formed and established in 1998 as second-tier league after FAM decision to allows clubs other than state FAs to compete in the professional level football league in Malaysia. It was then succeeded in 2004 by the formation of Liga Premier by Football Association of Malaysia (FAM).

The last champions of Liga Perdana 2 is Public Bank which won the league in 2003 season. Since the league inception, four teams has been the champion of Liga Perdana 2 where Terengganu, Johor, Kelantan, Johor FC, Kedah, and Public Bank each wins one time.

History

Founding 
A football league competition involving the representative sides of the state football associations was first held in Malaysia in 1979. When it began, it was intended primarily as a qualifying tournament for the final knock-out stages of the Malaysia Cup. It was not  until 1982 that a League Cup was introduced to recognise the winners of the preliminary stage as the league champions. Over the years, the league competition has gained important stature in its own right.

Initially the only teams allowed to participate in the league were the state FA's sides, teams representing the Armed Forces and the Police, and teams representing the neighbouring countries of Singapore and Brunei (though the Football Association of Singapore pulled out of the Malaysian League after the 1994 season following a dispute with the Football Association of Malaysia over gate receipts, and has not been involved since).

In 1992, FAM created another amateur league for local clubs in Malaysia to compete,  which is called the National League (Liga Nasional in Malay) The league was managed by FAM outside entity, Super Club Sdn. Bhd. Some of the clubs which compete in the league are Hong Chin, Muar FA, PKNK from Kedah, DBKL, PKNS, BSN, LPN, BBMB, Proton, PPC and PKENJ. Unfortunately, the league only ran for a couple of seasons before it folded. Some of the clubs were then evolved and joined the main league, such as PKENJ, which became JCorp and now as JDT.

Between 1994 and 1997, there was no second level league as the top two leagues were combined. 1994 was when Malaysian football league turned professional. The Liga Semi-Pro essentially replaced by the Liga Perdana, a new national league which was added, alongside a second cup competition, Piala FA, joined the existing Malaysia Cup.

In 1997, promotion from Malaysia FAM Cup to the professional Malaysian League was introduced for the first time. Johor FC and NS Chempaka FC were the first two sides to be promoted that year to Liga Perdana 2 for 1998 season.

In 1998, Liga Perdana was divided into two divisions consist of Liga Perdana 1 and Liga Perdana 2. During this time both of the division was still just referred as Malaysian League as a whole.

During 1998, Liga Perdana 1 consist of 12 teams while Liga Perdana 2 had 8 teams. 10 teams that previously qualified for Malaysia Cup which played in 1997 Liga Perdana was automatically qualified to Liga Perdana 1. The other two spots were filled by playoff round of 5 lowest teams in 1997 Liga Perdana and the Malaysian Olympic football team. The lowest four teams from playoff round will then put into Liga Perdana 2 alongside Police, Malaysia Military, Negeri Sembilan Chempaka F.C and PKN Johor. At this time the league still consisted of semi-pro team where each team was allowed to register 25 players where 12 players must be a professional for Liga Perdana 1 and a minimum of six professional players in Liga Perdana 2.

Both leagues continued until 2003 when Football Association of Malaysia (FAM) decided to privatise the league for 2004 season onwards where Liga Super was formed. Teams in Liga Perdana 1 and Liga Perdana 2 was then was put through a qualification and playoff to be promoted into Liga Super. Teams that failed the qualification was put into new second-tier league, the Liga Premier.

Teams 
In its inaugural season eight teams competing in the league.  The lowest four teams from playoff round for Liga Perdana 1 were put into Liga Perdana 2 alongside PDRM, ATM, Negeri Sembilan Chempaka F.C and PKN Johor.

Teams competing in 1998 season 
Eight teams competing in the first season of Liga Perdana 2.

  Terengganu
  Johor
  Kelantan
  NS Chempaka
  Johor FC
  Malacca
  ATM
  PDRM

League Table:-

1.Terengganu  - 30 PTS (1998 Liga Perdana 2 Champions)

2.Johor  - 25 PTS

3.Kelantan  - 24 PTS

4.NS Chempaka  - 22 PTS

5.Johor FC  - 16 PTS

6.Malacca  - 16 PTS

7.ATM  - 14 PTS

8.PDRM  - 7 PTS (Relegated to Malaysia FAM League)

Teams competing in 1999 season 
10 teams competing in the second season of Liga Perdana 2.

  Johor
  Selangor
  Johor FC
  Perlis
  Kelantan
  Malacca
  ATM
  TMFC
  NS Chempaka
  Kelantan TNB

League Table:-

1.Johor  - 38 PTS (1999 Liga Perdana 2 Champions)

2.Selangor  - 37 PTS (Promoted to Liga Perdana 1)

3.Johor FC  - 33 PTS 

4.Perlis  - 31 PTS (Promoted to Liga Perdana 1)

5.Kelantan  - 29 PTS

6.Malacca  - 26 PTS

7.ATM  - 25 PTS

8.TMFC  - 24 PTS

9.NS Chempaka  - 14 PTS

10.Kelantan TNB  - 13 PTS

Teams competing in 2000 season 
10 teams competing in the third season of Liga Perdana 2.

  Kelantan
  Malacca
  Kedah
  Kelantan JKR
  Kelantan TNB
  ATM
  Johor FC
  TMFC
  KL Malay Mail
  NS Chempaka

League Table:-

1.Kelantan  - 36 PTS (2000 Liga Perdana 2 Champions)

2.Malacca  - 33 PTS (Promoted to Liga Perdana 1)

3.Kedah  - 30 PTS

4.Kelantan JKR  - 28 PTS

5.Kelantan TNB  - 23 PTS

6.ATM  - 22 PTS

7.Johor FC  - 21 PTS

8.TMFC  - 20 PTS

9.KL Malay Mail  - 17 PTS

10.NS Chempaka  - 13 PTS

Teams competing in 2001 season 
12 teams competing in the fourth season of Liga Perdana 2.

  Johor FC
  Sabah
  NS Chempaka
  Brunei
  Kelantan TNB
  TM
  Kelantan JKR
  KL Malay Mail
  Kedah JKR
  PDRM FA
  Kedah
  ATM

League Table:-

1.Johor FC  - 47 PTS (2001 Liga Perdana 2 Champions)

2.Sabah  - 45 PTS (Promoted to Liga Perdana 1)

3.NS Chempaka  - 37 PTS (Promoted to Liga Perdana 1)

4.Brunei  - 33 PTS

5.Kelantan TNB  - 32 PTS

6.TM  - 31 PTS

7.Kelantan JKR  - 29 PTS

8.KL Malay Mail  - 24 PTS

9.Kedah JKR  - 24 PTS

10.PDRM FA  - 22 PTS

11.Kedah  - 21 PTS

12.ATM  - 18 PTS

Teams competing in 2002 season 
12 teams competing in the fifth season of Liga Perdana 2.

  Kedah
  TM
  MPPJ FC
  Selangor Public Bank FC
  Brunei
  Johor
  PDRM FA
  ATM
  Kelantan TNB
  Kelantan SKMK
  KL Malay Mail
  Kedah JKR

League Table:-

1.Kedah  - 50 PTS (2002 Liga Perdana 2 Champions)

2.TM  - 47 PTS (Promoted to Liga Perdana 1)

3.MPPJ FC  - 38 PTS

4.Selangor Public Bank FC  - 38 PTS

5.Brunei  - 36 PTS 

6.Johor  - 32 PTS

7.PDRM FA  - 32 PTS

8.ATM  - 22 PTS

9.Kelantan TNB  - 21 PTS

10.Kelantan SKMK  - 21 PTS

11.KL Malay Mail  - 18 PTS (Pull out from the league)

12.Kedah JKR  - 13 PTS (Pull out from the league)

Teams competing in 2003 season 
12 teams competing in the sixth season of Liga Perdana 2.

  Public Bank
  Negeri Sembilan
  Johor
  MPPJ FC
  Brunei
  Kuala Lumpur
  Kelantan SKMK
  PDRM
  Kelantan TNB
  ATM
  Kelantan JPS
  Perak TKN

League Table:-

1.Public Bank  - 53 PTS (2003 Liga Perdana 2 Champions)

2.Negeri Sembilan  - 42 PTS (Promotion Play-Off) (Stay in the league)

3.Johor  - 40 PTS (Promotion Play-Off) (Stay in the league)

4.MPPJ FC  - 39 PTS (Promotion Play-Off) (Stay in the league)

5.Brunei  - 39 PTS

6.Kuala Lumpur  - 31 PTS

7.Kelantan SKMK  - 31 PTS

8.PDRM  - 28 PTS

9.Kelantan TNB  - 24 PTS

10.ATM  - 19 PTS

11.Kelantan JPS  - 18 PTS

12.Perak TKN  - 5 PTS

Champions 
Below is the list of champions of Liga Perdana 2 since its inception as second-tier league in 1998.

Players

Golden Boot Winners 
Below is the list of golden boot winners of Liga Perdana 2 since its inception as second-tier league in 1998.

References 

 
1
Defunct top level football leagues in Asia
Sports leagues established in 1998